Arshan is the name of several rural localities in Russia:
Arshan, Republic of Buryatia, a settlement in Arshansky Selsoviet of Tunkinsky District in the Republic of Buryatia
Arshan, Kuytunsky District, Irkutsk Oblast, a village in Kuytunsky District of Irkutsk Oblast
Arshan, Tulunsky District, Irkutsk Oblast, a settlement in Tulunsky District of Irkutsk Oblast
Arshan, Alarsky District, Irkutsk Oblast, a village in Alarsky District of Irkutsk Oblast
Arshan, Republic of Kalmykia, a settlement under the administrative jurisdiction of the City of Elista in the Republic of Kalmykia;